David Whittaker (born 24 April 1957 in Bury, England) is known for numerous video game music which he wrote in most of the 1980s and early 1990s, for many different formats.

Career
He is known for some of the work he produced in the late 1980s/early 1990s. While making music, he often programmed music directly, instead of using any music composition tools, using just a "machine code monitor"—and then an 'assembler' system/program—including SuperSoft's and then Commodore's tools. Commodore 64 was the format that he composed for most frequently. He was more impressed with the Amiga's more developed technical sound capabilities, but used a few of the same instrument sounds, in several of his works, for Amiga. These days, he works mostly in the field of computer game sound effects and voices rather than music.

Although he does not compose much at present, he is still involved in the implementation of music, ambiences, sound FX and his admitted forte, dialogue (hence, his current moniker: DialogueGuru).

His most successful compositions appeared probably in Amiga games such as Shadow of the Beast, Obliterator, Beyond the Ice Palace, and Speedball. On the Commodore 64, his most popular compositions include for example Glider Rider, Storm, Street Surfer and Armageddon Man. His subtune 21 of Lazy Jones was the basis for the dance hit "Kernkraft 400" by Zombie Nation.  Many of his other tunes can be heard on internet radio stations such as SLAY Radio. Other formats he has composed for include Amstrad CPC, Atari ST, Atari 8-bit family, MSX and ZX Spectrum. Many of his old songs are these days remixed by video game music enthusiasts.

After 8 years working in the US for Electronic Arts at their Redwood Shores studio, he joined the British video game developer Traveller's Tales, at their studio in Knutsford, Cheshire as Head of Audio in September 2004.

Games with music by Whittaker

References

External links

 Photograph of Whittaker at Lemon64.com
 Whittaker's Amiga music at UnExoticA
 David Whittaker at MobyGames
 Artist profile at OverClocked ReMix
 Remix64 Interview with David Whittaker Carr, Neil (2 October 2001)

1957 births
Living people
Amiga people
British composers
Video game composers
Commodore 64 music